Dummer is a parish and village in Hampshire, England. It is 6 miles south-west of Basingstoke and near Junction 7 on the M3 motorway.

In the 2001 census, it had a population of 643, with 127 dwellings, reducing to a population of 466 in 201 households at the 2011 Census.

History
The name of the village is derived from Dun (meaning hill) and Mer (lake or pond). The English surname 'Dummer' is thought to originate from here, as the Dummer family were lords of the manor between the 12th and 16th centuries.

All Saints Church is in the centre of the village. The church is part of the Church of England benefice of Farleigh, Candover and Wield, served by the same Rector.

A public house, The Queen Inn, is north of the church on Down Street towards the M3.

Also towards the M3 is the Dummer Golf Club, the course lying to the northeast of the village.

On the other side of the M3 north of the A30 is the Dummer Garden Centre, and a public house, The Sun Inn. A short distance south-west down the A30 is another public house and hotel, The Wheatsheaf.

This is the site of the Dummer Cricket Centre which was founded by Major Ronald Ferguson, father of Sarah, Duchess of York. The current owner, Andrew Ferguson, was a local councillor on Dummer Parish Council.

Governance
The village is part of the civil parish of Dummer, which is part of the Oakley and North Waltham ward of Basingstoke and Deane borough council. The borough council is a non-metropolitan district of Hampshire County Council.

Location
Position: 
Nearby towns and cities: Alton, Andover, Basingstoke, Newbury, Winchester
Nearby villages: Axford, Cliddesden, Farleigh Wallop, Hook, Kingsclere, Micheldever Station, North Waltham, Oakley, Old Basing, Overton, Popham, Steventon, Whitchurch.

Notable people

The Dummer family
Sarah, Duchess of York
Air Marshal Sir Thomas Elmhirst KBE CB AFC DL RAF, first Commander-in-chief of the Indian Air Force
Tara Palmer-Tomkinson, aristocrat and socialite
Ronald Ferguson, father of Sarah, Duchess of York
Susan Barrantes, mother of Sarah, Duchess of York
Charles Palmer-Tomkinson, aristocrat and socialite
Marian Montagu Douglas Scott, paternal grandmother of Sarah, Duchess of York
Charles Rycroft, psychologist

References

External links

 Dummer parish council
 Amateur Football Club Dummer

Villages in Hampshire
Civil parishes in Basingstoke and Deane